This is a list of museums in Tehran, the capital city of Iran. Some of museums located in Tehran, have national and international importance. There are a number of large museums in Tehran that deal with a wide range of subjects. For example, the National Museum of Iran is distinguished in Iranian archeology, the Carpet Museum of Iran exhibits the art of Iranian carpet weaving, and the Tehran Museum of Contemporary Art preserves the works of international artists.

List

Gallery

See also
 List of museums in Iran
 Culture of Iran
 Culture of Tehran
 Tourism in Tehran

References

External links
 Top 10 Museums You Can't Miss in Tehran - SURFIRAN
 Top 13 Museums in Tehran 2021 - Best Tehran Museums
 National Museum of Iran: Silk Roads Programme
 THE 10 BEST Museums You'll Want to Visit in Tehran - Tripadvisor

Museums in Tehran
Tehran
Tehran-related lists